The Mayor's and City of London Court is a sitting of the County Court in the City of London. It is located at Guildhall Buildings, Basinghall Street.

History
The current court is the successor to courts pre-dating the County Courts Act 1846, which introduced the modern system of county courts. The 1846 Act deliberately did not extend to the City of London, where the prior constituted courts continued to exercise jurisdiction:

The Palace Court also exercised jurisdiction within the City in certain cases before its abolition in 1849.

The two courts were combined with effect from 1 January 1921 by the Mayor's and City of London Court Act 1920. High Court procedure was declared to apply to matters formerly dealt with by the Mayor's Court, while county court procedure applied to matters falling under the City of London Court.

1971 reform
Under s. 42 of the Courts Act 1971, the old Mayor's and City of London Court was abolished, the City of London was made a county court district, and the new county court for the city of London was given the name of its predecessor. It was the only county court not to contain "county" in its title. The individual county courts have since been replaced by a single County Court for England and Wales.

See also
List of County Court venues in England and Wales

Further reading

External links

References

Legal buildings in London
City of London
Court buildings in London
County courts in England and Wales